The Conflict Lens is an on-line conflict management tool which identifies an individual’s behavior in conflict situations and assesses  the outcome.

Development 
Conflict style inventories are most often used in leadership and management training courses or in executive coaching sessions.
Conflict style inventories, which first appeared in the 1960s, were most often based on the work of Robert R. Blake and Jane Mouton using their Managerial Grid Model. Blake and Mouton used two axes. “Concern for people” is plotted on the Y axis and “Concern for task” is plotted on axis X. Using this group they developed five differing styles of approaching conflict resolution often referenced as: win-win, win-lose, compromise, avoid, and comply. In 1974, Kenneth W. Thomas and Ralph H. Kilman adopted this model and created the Thomas Kilmann Conflict Mode Instrument. This is the best known of the conflict style inventories. Another often used instrument is the Conflict Dynamics Profile offered by Eckerd College in Florida. This is primarily designed to be offered as a 360 degree instrument.

In 2001 Glenn Hallam, Ph.D., Paul Seymour Ph.D. and Gina Hallam, M.A. published the Conflict Lens, an on-line instrument based on the premise that conflict management is a skill that can be learned if people know which behaviors lead to constructive outcomes and which behaviors lead to destructive outcomes. The Conflict Lens is founded on the belief that the concept of style is limited in that it does not inform a person what behaviors would be most valuable in successfully resolving conflict and that conflict resolution is based more on situational context  than on dominant style (Callanan, Benzing, and Perri, 2006). The behaviors were identified through empirical research and indicate how to approach the relational aspects of conflict resolution and the actual issue itself. The instrument is based on a taxonomy of behaviors considering research by Johnson and Johnson (2000), Thomas (1975)  and Deutch (1973).

Description 
The Conflict Lens asks a person to identify two actual conflicts they were involved in, and then asks them to answer 53 items about what they did, felt, or thought during the conflict and 13 items about the outcomes of each conflict. A 12-page computer generated report shows scores on how the person behaved on 10 dichotomous behavioral dimensions and whether the person saw the outcome as destructive or constructive. The scales are: Affiliate vs. Alienate; Analyze vs. Intuit; Compromise vs. Stand Firm; Control vs. Comply; Empathize vs. Egoize; Engage vs. Avoid; Own vs. Blame; Seek Support vs. Go Solo; Self-Restrain vs. Emote; and Trust vs. Distrust. The report contrasts the two conflicts so that the person can see how they behaved similarly or differently depending on the circumstances. The report also gives participants specific suggestions on what they did particularly well and how they might be more effective in the future.  A Group Report for use in team building is also available. Trainers who use the instrument must be certified to order and interpret the instrument. The Conflict Lens is published and distributed by Work Effects Inc. in Minneapolis, Minnesota.

Strengths 
The Conflict Lens focuses on specific behaviors instead of delineating style.  The instrument asks the person to identify specific conflicts they were involved in vs. the usual method of asking people how they generally behaved. Sandy et al. (2000) write, “(T)here is reason to believe that conflict behavior is determined by both situational and dispositional influences.” Research by Rahim (1986) indicates that a manager in conflict with a supervisor typically yields, while with peers the manager compromises and with subordinates the manager problem solves. The instrument allows respondents to analyze how they responded in different situations. The ten behavioral dimensions are researched based best practices which allow a person to create a behavioral roadmap to use in the future and instructs people on both what to do and what not to do. Reliability and Validity data is available in a technical report. The average Cronbach’s alpha is .71. It is available in 19 languages and has been used worldwide. Support materials for interpretation and training are available in each language.

Weaknesses 
The Conflict Lens was normed on a US population and cross cultural analysis is not yet available. Some respondents who tend to avoid conflict sometimes find it difficult to identify two conflicts they were personally involved in. The Conflict Lens is based on self-reports and how a person perceives themselves to have behaved which may differ from how others perceived the behavior. Also, the instrument measures how a person believes they behaved but does not assess how well they actually executed the behavior.

References

External links 
Conflict Lens.com. (http://www.conflictlens.com)

Dispute resolution
Personality tests